Vettai is Singapore Tamil language police procedural drama television series created by Anuratha Kanderaju and Abbas Akbar for the Singapore Tamil Channel, MediaCorp Vasantham. The series' first season was on-air from November 23, 2010 to March 30, 2011, every Monday to Thursday, 10.30pm and the second season was on-air from January 4, 2012 to May 11, 2013. Meanwhile, the third season started to air on Deepavali 2014 and end by Spring 2015 and the fourth season started to air from December 11, 2017 to March 29, 2018, every Monday to Thursday at 10.00pm

This long-form drama series was directed by Anuratha Kanderaju and Abbas Akbar. Meanwhile, the third season were directed by Anuratha Kanderaju, Kumaran Sundaram and Don Arvind. And the 4th Season was directed by Kumaran Sundaram and SS Vikneshwaran. The series is one of the most watched television series in Singapore.

Series overview
The base of the drama is set in a fictionalized police unit that specializes in unraveling unsolved cases which are often referred to as cold cases.

They are part of a special task force assembled just to tackle cold cases pertaining to the Indian community and Indian immigrants. The unit is not widely publicized and kept under wraps but their work is consuming to say the least.

Seasons overview

Seasons

Season 1

The first season known as Vettai : Pledged to Hunt ran for 72 episodes. Due to its high degree of popularity and TV ratings, the final 3 episodes of the season were shown on Cathay, Orchard Cineleisure, at 7pm.

Season 2

Following the positive reception of the first season, a second season, titled Vettai 2.0: The Next Generation was produced. The first episode aired on January 4, 2012, with a special behind-the-scenes episode airing the day before. The second season aired in the same time slot as its predecessor: 10:30pm to 11pm from Monday to Thursday on Vasantham.

Cast
Gunalan Morgan as Mugi
Arvind Naidu as Shan
Vignesh Wadarajan as Seelan
Eswari Gunasagar as Meera 
Jaynesh as Raghav

Season 3
Due to the popularity of the first two seasons a third season titled Vettai 3: The Final Judgment started to air on Deepavali in 2014. The series was on every weekend at 10.30pm. The 3rd season was directed by Anuratha Kanderaju, Kumaran Sundaram and Don Arvind.

Cast
Arvind Naidu as Shan
Eswari Gunasagar as Meera
Gunalan Morgan as Mugi
Roxanne Sylvia as Diana
Saravanan Ayyavoo as Shiva
Vignesh Wadarajan as Seelan
Raghadeepan Santheran as Sakthi
Nithiya Rao as Maha

Season 4
A fourth season titled Vettai 4: The Force started to air on December 11, 2017, with a special behind-the-scenes episode airing on December 7, 2017. The series was on every weekend at 10pm. The 4th season was directed by Kumaran Sundaram and SS Vikneshwaran.

Cast
Puravalan as DSP Pradeep
Vignesh Wadarajan as DSP Seelan
Thavanesan as INSP Dhayal
Seshan as INSP Suhas
Magalakshmi as INSP Maya
Malene Waters as INSP Swathi
Eswari Gunasagar as Meera (Cameo)
Gunalan Morgan as Mugi (Cameo)

Cast and characters

Awards
At the 2011 Pradhana Vizha awards, the series won "Most Popular Series", while Shabir won "Best Actor",  Gunalan won "Most Popular Male Personality" and Gayathiri won "Most Popular Female Personality".

References

External links
 Official Site - Vettai

Vasantham TV original programming
Tamil-language television shows in Singapore
Singapore Tamil dramas
2010 Tamil-language television series debuts
2011 Tamil-language television seasons